Peter Hosking (born 19 December 1947) is an Australian actor and audiobook narrator.

Education
Hosking graduated from Royal Melbourne Institute of Technology Dip. Civil Engineering.

Career
Hosking started acting professionally at The Pram Factory in Melbourne in 1978.

In 1996, Hosking received TDK Australian Audio Book Award for Home Before Dark. The same year, he starred in an episode of Halifax f.p.

In 2002 he created Nu Country TV, a country music show on community tv station C31 Melbourne. He produced, filmed and edited this show for four years. The show is still running in 2017.

In 2010 he was interviewed by phone by Vision Australia regarding his 25 years of narrating audio books many of his narrations have been reviewed by Audiofile Magazine in the USA,

After 30 years in Australian theatre, film, tv and voice work, moved to Prague in Czech Republic where he works with the Cimrman English Theatre performing English language translations of the works of Jára Cimrman, a man voted the greatest Czech of all time.

In 2018, Hosking voiced the character Hanush of Leipa in the 2018 video game Kingdom Come: Deliverance.

References 

1947 births
Living people
Audiobook narrators
Australian male actors